Shaukat is a Muslim male and female given name whose meaning is "Power" and "Dignity". Its origin is Persian.

Disambiguation 
People named Shaukat include:

 Shaukat Ali, a Pakistani folk singer
 Shaukat Aziz (1949 - present), the Prime Minister of Pakistan from 2004 to 2007
 Shaukat Siddiqui (1923 - 2006), a Pakistani writer of fiction 
 Haji Shaukat Ali Lohar (born 1972), politician and businessman 
 Shaukat Agriculture Industry, an Agriculture Industry, Pakistan
 Shaukat Kaifi, a small-time Indian actress; wife of poet Kaifi Azmi
 Shaukat (wrestler), the first Malaysian professional wrestler